An Unusual Angle (1983) was the debut novel by Australian science fiction writer Greg Egan by Norstrilia Press. It concerns a high school boy who makes movies inside his head using a bio-mechanical camera, one that he has grown. He is also able to send out other "viewpoints", controlled with his "psi" powers, of which he has more power than anyone else he's ever met. Most of the book concerns the boy trying to get his films out of his head, but no brain surgeon will believe him.

1983 Australian novels
Novels by Greg Egan
Cyborgs in literature
1983 science fiction novels
1983 debut novels